Kareng (Pron:/ˌkɑ:ɹɛŋ ˈgɑ:/, "royal palace"), also known as The Garhgaon Palace, is located in  Garhgaon  from Sivasagar, Assam, India. Of all Ahom ruins, the Kareng Ghar is one of the grandest examples of Ahom architecture. The palace structures were made of wood and stone.

After the destruction of the old palace it was rebuilt around 1752 as the present seven-storied structure by Suremphaa (1751–1769).

The earliest constructions were commissioned by Sukhrungphaa in 1698 AD. Rangpur was the capital of the Ahom Kingdom and served as its military station.

Architecture

Kareng
After Sukhrungphaa's death, the Kareng Ghar went through many architectural alterations to its structure, which resulted in its irregular shape. From east to west, several rooms run along a long corridor; and from north to south are smaller wings. The ground floor served as stables, storerooms, and servants' quarters. The Kareng was built mainly of wood, which was largely destroyed over time. The royal apartments were on the upper storey, of which only a few rooms now remain, close to an octagonal room on the northern wing which once served as the Puja Ghar (prayer house). There are stairs leading up to the terrace. An isolated room stands on the south which is believed to have been used by the queen during her confinement.

See also
 Ahom Kingdom
 Charaideo
 Rang Ghar
 Sibsagar
 Talatal Ghar
 Tai people
 Ahom people

References

External links

 Kareng Ghar, Gargaon at assamportal.com.
 Kareng Ghar at indiamapped.com.
 Kareng Ghar at meghalayatimes.org
 Kareng Ghar & Talatal Ghar at mapsofindia.com

Capitals of Ahom kingdom
Tourist attractions in Assam
Forts in Assam
Royal residences in India
Palaces in Assam
Sivasagar
Cultural history of Assam
1752 establishments in India
Buildings and structures completed in 1752
Ahom kingdom